Bati del Wambara fl. 1531, (Harari: ባቲ ዲል ወምበራ, lit. victory is her seat) was the Harari wife of the 16th-century general, Ahmad ibn Ibrahim, and then his successor, Nur ibn Mujahid. She was extremely influential in shaping both her husbands' military policies in their campaigns against the Ethiopian Empire.

Biography
Bati del Wambara was born the daughter of Mahfuz, Emir of Harar and later governor of Zeila. She married Imam Ahmad ibn Ibrahim al-Ghazi and accompanied him in his jihad to make Ethiopia a Muslim province. During this expedition, she gave birth to two sons - Muhammad in 1531 and Ahmad in 1533.

When her husband was killed and their eldest son captured by the forces of Emperor Gelawdewos (the son of Emperor Lebna Dengle), del Wambara successfully negotiated with the Dowager Empress Seble Wongel to exchange the captured brother of Gelawdewos for the boy. Del Wambara then fled to Harar with 40 soldiers and 300 horsemen.

In 1552, nearly 10 years after Imam ibn Ibrahim's death, she married the successive Emir of Adal, Nur ibn Mujahid. This was a political marriage aiming to enforce Nur's legitimacy. She is supposed to have pushed him into reviving the jihad in order to avenge the death of her deceased husband. In 1559, Nur ibn Mujahid's forces fought against the heavily outnumbered Emperor Gelawdewos in Fatagar, and the dead body of Ethiopian emperor was beheaded, reportedly on the order of del Wambara.

References

Somali monarchs
People from the Adal Sultanate
16th-century Somalian people
African women in war
Women in 16th-century warfare
16th-century births
1559 deaths
16th-century women rulers